San Giovanni a Cerreto is a village in Tuscany, central Italy, administratively a frazione of the comune of Castelnuovo Berardenga, province of Siena. At the time of the 2001 census its population was 276.

San Giovanni a Cerreto is about 10 km from Siena and 15 km from Castelnuovo Berardenga.

References 

Frazioni of Castelnuovo Berardenga